The 11th European Cross Country Championships were held at Seebad Heringsdorf in Germany on 12 December 2004. Serhiy Lebid took his fifth title in the men's competition and Hayley Yelling won the women's race.

Results
Complete results at the archive of The Sports.org.

Men individual 9.64 km

Total 89 competitors

Men teams

Total 15 teams

Women individual 5.64 km

Total 74 competitors

Women teams

Total 13 teams

Junior men individual 5.64 km

Total 107 competitors

Junior men teams

Total 18 teams

Junior women individual 3.64 km

Total 89 competitors

Junior women teams

Total 15 teams

References

External links 
 Database containing all results between 1994–2007

European Cross Country Championships
European Cross Country Championships
Sports competitions in Mecklenburg-Western Pomerania
Cross country running in Germany
2000s in Mecklenburg-Western Pomerania
2004 in German sport